For Ireland's Sake is a 1914 American silent film produced by Gene Gauntier Feature Players and distributed by Warner's Features. it was directed by Sidney Olcott with himself, Gene Gauntier and Jack J. Clark in the leading roles.

Cast
 Gene Gauntier as Eileen Donaghue
 Jack J. Clark as Marty O'Sullivan
 Mrs Norina as Mrs Bridget Donaghue
 Sidney Olcott as Father Flannigan

Production notes
The film was shot in Ireland, in Beaufort, co Kerry, during summer 1913.

References
 Michel Derrien, Aux origines du cinéma irlandais: Sidney Olcott, le premier oeil, TIR 2013.  
 Denis Condon, Touristic Work and Pleasure: The Kalem Company in Killarney

External links
  
For Ireland's Sake at Irish Film & TV Research Online  
 For Ireland's Sake website dedicated to Sidney Olcott
Full restored film at YouTube

1914 films
Silent American drama films
American silent short films
Films set in Ireland
Films shot in Ireland
Films directed by Sidney Olcott
1914 short films
1914 drama films
American black-and-white films
1910s American films